The Canon of Groningen is a list of 40 hallmarks and 52 icons that provides a chronological summary of the history of the city and province of Groningen.

On 8 May 2008, the canon was launched by the Queen's Commissioner Max van den Berg by firing a cannon at the Groninger Archieven. The canon has appeared in print and can be viewed online. This is the first provincial canon after the publication of the Canon of the Netherlands in 2006.

Hallmarks
A selection of themes covered in the canon:
 1. Hunebedden (3000 BCE–2000 BCE)
 10. The staple right (1473–1798)
 13. Battle of Heiligerlee (1568)
 14. The Reduction (1594)
 24. Patriotten and prinsgezinden (1780–1795)
 27. The Afscheiding (1834–1840)
 32. De Ploeg (1918–present)
 37. The Gas Bubble of Slochteren (1959–present)
 40. Blauwe Stad (2005)

Icons
 Ludger (742–809), missionary
  (10th/11th century), martyr
 Emo of Friesland ( 1175–1237), abbot and chronicler
  (born 1213), abbot and chronicler
 Rodolphus Agricola (1444–1485), humanist scholar
  (died 1554), businesswoman
  (1539–1580), watergeus
 Ubbo Emmius (1547–1625), rector magnificus
 William Louis, Count of Nassau-Dillenburg (1560–1620), stadhouder
  (1599–1665), diplomat
 Carl von Rabenhaupt (1602–1675), defender of Stad and Ommelanden
 Abel Tasman (1603–1659), explorer
 Adriaan Geerts Wildervanck (1605–1661), peat colonist and founder of Wildervank
  (1650–1723), painter
 Johann Bernoulli (1667–1748), mathematician, physicist, professor
 John William, Baron Ripperda (1682–1737), ambassador
 Rudolf de Mepsche (1695–1754), jonker and grietman
 Daniel Bernoulli (1700–1782), mathematician, physicist, professor
 Wilhelmus Schortinghuis (1700–1750), minister and pietist
 Petrus Camper (1722–1789), zoologist, physician and professor
  (1737–1815), rinderpest fighter and patriot
  (1743–1822), minister and patriot
  (1752–1821), schoolteacher and education reformer
  (1753–1828), founder of the 
 Hendrik de Cock (1801–1842), minister, stood at the cradle of the Afscheiding
 Anthony Winkler Prins (1817–1908), writer and chief editor of the Winkler Prins encyclopedia
 Willem Albert Scholten (1819–1892), industrialist
 Jozef Israëls (1824–1911), painter
 Samuel van Houten (1837–1930), politician
 Otto Eerelman (1839–1926), painter
  (1847–1902), publisher of the Bosatlas
 Hendrik Goeman Borgesius (1847–1917), minister
 Jacobus Kapteyn (1851–1922), astronomer and professor
 Heike Kamerlingh Onnes (1853–1926), physicist and Nobel laureate
 Aletta Jacobs (1854–1929), physician
  (1868–1934), politician
 Kornelis ter Laan (1871–1963), politician
 Johan Huizinga (1872–1945), historian
  (1873–1955), illustrator
 Hendrik Nicolaas Werkman (1882–1945), artist
 Albert Egges van Giffen (1884–1973), archaeologist
 Frits Zernike (1888–1966), physicist and Nobel laureate
 Hendrik de Vries (1896–1989), poet and painter
 Dirk Stikker (1897–1979), Secretary General of NATO and diplomat
 Bert Röling (1906–1985), jurist
 Sicco Mansholt (1908–1995), minister and President of the European Commission
 Fré Meis (1921–1992), trade unionist
 Gerrit Krol (1934–2013), writer and poet
 Rutger Kopland (1934–2012), poet
 Ede Staal (1941–1986), singer
 Wubbo Ockels (1946–2014), astronaut
 Marianne Timmer (born 1974), speed skater

See also
 Canon of the Netherlands
 
 Canon of Friesland
 
 
 
 
 Canon of Curaçao

References

Dutch history timelines
Historiography of the Netherlands
History of Groningen (province)
History of Groningen (city)